Larry Lee "Zeke" Jones (born December 2, 1966) is an American wrestler who won a silver medal at the 1992 Summer Olympics in Barcelona, a world championship in Varna, Bulgaria, in 1991, and was the former freestyle head coach at USA Wrestling. He is currently the head coach of the Arizona State University Wrestling team as of April, 2014. He was a six-time national freestyle champion, four-time World Cup champion, Pan American Games champion, and received the "World's Most Technical Wrestler Award" awarded by FILA, the international governing body for the sport.  In college, he was a three-time All-American for Arizona State University and competed on the 1988 NCAA Championship team, coached by famed Bobby Douglas. After college, he wrestled on two world championships teams with the United States wrestling team.  In 2005, he was inducted into the National Wrestling Hall of Fame as a Distinguished Member.

He was the head coach of the 2012 US Olympic freestyle wrestling team, Jones coached at the collegiate division I level for 18 years. His first college coaching position was an assistant coach at Bloomsburg University, Arizona State University and West Virginia University before becoming the head coach at the University of Pennsylvania in 2005.  In April 2014 he was hired as the head coach for the Arizona State Sun Devils. In 2008, he accepted the head coach position for the United States freestyle wrestling team with USA Wrestling at the Olympic Training Center in Colorado Springs, Colorado. In August 2013, Jones helped coach Kyle Snyder to a junior world championship in Sofia, Bulgaria.

Early life
Jones was born in Ypsilanti, Michigan. He started wrestling under the influence of his brother Johnnie, a two-time junior college national champion for Schoolcraft Junior College and later a wrestler on Iowa State's national runner-up team in 1976. He was citywide champion at Scarlett Junior High School, in Ann Arbor, Michigan, where he was coached by James Bryant.

In high school, he amassed a 111-6 record, finishing 2nd and 1st in the Michigan High School State Championships in 1984 and 1985 competing for Huron High School in Ann Arbor, Michigan. In high school he was coached by Tom Davids and Ernie Gillum. He was a three-time High School All-American at the Junior National Championships and was named Dream Team All-American selection by Wrestling USA Magazine in 1985. Jones was named to the Huron High School Hall of Fame in 2002.

Jones signed with Bobby Douglas and Sun Devils in 1985.  He compiled a 139-21 record and garnering three All-American honors at the NCAA's, three Pac-10 championships, Midlands Title, and was the NCAA finalist his senior year.

References

External links
 Zeke Jones website

1966 births
Living people
Olympic silver medalists for the United States in wrestling
Wrestlers at the 1992 Summer Olympics
American male sport wrestlers
Sportspeople from Ann Arbor, Michigan
Arizona State University alumni
World Wrestling Championships medalists
Medalists at the 1992 Summer Olympics
Pan American Games gold medalists for the United States
Pan American Games bronze medalists for the United States
Pan American Games medalists in wrestling
Wrestlers at the 1991 Pan American Games
Wrestlers at the 1995 Pan American Games
Sportspeople from Ypsilanti, Michigan
Medalists at the 1991 Pan American Games
Medalists at the 1995 Pan American Games
20th-century American people
21st-century American people